The 2006 ICC World Cricket League Africa Region Division Three was a cricket tournament in South Africa, taking place between 23 April and 28 April 2006. It gave eight African Associate and Affiliate members of the International Cricket Council experience of international one-day cricket and formed part of the global World Cricket League structure.

The top team, Mozambique was promoted to Division 2.

Teams

There were 8 teams that played in the tournament. These teams were non-test member nations of the African Cricket Association. The teams that played were:

Squads

Group stage

Points Table

Group stage

5th Place Playoff

Semifinals and Finals

Statistics

International cricket competitions in 2006
2006, 3
International cricket competitions in South Africa